Power Boothe is an American painter known for his abstract works as well as set designs for experimental theatre, dance and video productions.  He has also produced short films and visual theater. As a painter, he has been referred to as a "Rogue Minimalist".

Life and career
Boothe was born in Dallas, Texas in 1945 and grew up in Lafayette, California.  After studying painting at the California College of the Arts and the San Francisco Art Institute, he attended Colorado College, where he received a BA in Painting in 1969.  To attend the Whitney Museum Independent Study Program he moved to New York City in 1967.  He also studied linguistics and philosophy at the University of California, Berkeley, and classical archaeology in 1990 at the American School of Classical Studies at Athens in Greece.

Boothe was the Director of the Summer Program at Colorado College in 1977. He was a lecturer in the Humanities,  Visual Arts Program, at Princeton University from 1988 to 1994 and served on the faculty of the School of Visual Arts in New York City as an instructor from 1979 to 1988.  He held the position of co-director of the Mount Royal Graduate School of Art at the Maryland Institute College of Art from 1993 to 1998, and from 1998 to 2001 was Director of the School of Art at Ohio University.  From 2001 to 2010 he was Dean of the Hartford Art School of the University of Hartford, where he was responsible for raising funds to build the school's Renée Samuels Center, a studio facility for teaching art and technology. Afterwards he continued there as a Professor of Painting and Drawing from 2011 to the present.

Boothe's work is included in the public collections of the Metropolitan Museum of Art, the Guggenheim Museum, the Whitney Museum, and the Museum of Modern Art in New York, the Wadsworth Atheneum in Hartford, the Baltimore Museum of Art, and the British Museum, as well as numerous other museums.  His work is also held by numerous private collections.  Boothe has participated in numerous solo and group shows.

Style
Writing in 1988 in The New York Times on the occasion of solo shows in Greenwich and Stamford, Connecticut, art critic Vivien Raynor says of Boothe:

Mr. Boothe began as a figural artist, but before the end of his student days in the late 1960's, he had turned to abstraction, becoming what might be called a rogue Minimalist. That is, he works according to the grid but is not its slave. The roguery is already evident in the early works at the [Greenwich] show, which spans from 1971 to 1988. These are the canvases bisected into two columns of sizable rectangles painted in pastel hues. Some are hard-edged, others blurred.By 1973, the artist is hitting his stride, notably in two all black canvases. The grids in these are each filled with a motif - a disk with a white spot at the center and a white spot with a small comet's tail -but it is the square-to-square modifications of the motif that are the subject. Indeed, Mr. Boothe's whole subject seems to be the variations possible between one part of a painting and another, and between one painting and another. At the same time, it could also be the idea behind the aphorism, "the more things change, the more they are the same."...More than anything else, it is the variations in mood that keep Mr. Boothe apart from hard core Minimalists, along with his hints of automatism and of a fascination with puzzles.

Harold E. Pocher writes about Boothe:

[He] does not neatly fit into the file for Minimalist artists. In his oils, you see brush strokes, and in his drawings, varied pencil techniques that show his hand. But in the body of work as a whole, you see staccato rhythms and a consistency that draws you into the patterns while engaging your curiosity through the subtle variations. ... Boothe allows the viewer to identify with the creator of the work and not see it as a manufactured product void of life. In this way he shares the aesthetic of Minimalism, but also offers a connection to the painterly artists who followed other avenues.

A New York Times review of a Boothe show in SoHo in 1995 said: "The syncopated patterns of Power Boothe's handsome abstractions, emblematic of a style that he has cultivated since the late 1960's, create intimations of the cinematic in the suggestion of a gentle, slow-motion light moving across a meticulously made surface that is still very much a painting."

Performing arts
In the performing arts, Boothe has designed sets for experimental theatre, dance and video productions. and has also produced short films and visual theater. For this work, he has received a Bessie Award for set design, a Film/Video Arts Foundation Award for film, and several Art Matters Grants for his theater productions. He has art directed and designed internationally-recognized music videos, and has designed sets for Obie Award-winning productions.

References

External links

1945 births
Living people
American male painters
Painters from Texas
Painters from California
Abstract painters
American set designers